Salinibacillus  is a genus of bacteria from the family of Bacillaceae.

References

Further reading 
 
 
 

 

Bacillaceae
Bacteria genera